Billy Martin and Russell Simpson were the defending champions, but Martin did not participate this year.  Simpson partnered Lloyd Bourne, losing in the first round.

Tim Gullikson and Tom Gullikson won the title, defeating John Austin and Johan Kriek 6–4, 7–6 in the final.

Seeds

  Mark Edmondson /  Kim Warwick (final)
  Tim Gullikson /  Tom Gullikson (champions)
  John Austin /  Johan Kriek (first round)
  Stan Smith /  Roscoe Tanner (quarterfinals)

Draw

Draw

External links
 Draw

1982 Grand Prix (tennis)
1982 Bristol Open